William Kenwright, CBE (born 4 September 1945) is an English West End theatre producer and film producer. He has also been the chairman of Everton Football Club since 2004.

Kenwright was born in Liverpool and attended Booker Avenue County Primary School, and then Liverpool Institute High School for Boys from 1957 to 1964. He appeared in school productions (including Shylock in The Merchant of Venice) on the stage in the Mount Street building (predecessor to LIPA). He was also treasurer of the Christian Union at school.

Kenwright was a judge in the 2007 BBC One television series Any Dream Will Do.

Theatre
Kenwright is one of the UK's most successful theatre producers, best known for the long-running West End hit Blood Brothers and the record-breaking UK tour of Joseph and the Amazing Technicolor Dreamcoat. Other productions have included West End runs of Whistle Down the Wind at the Palace Theatre, Festen in London, on a UK tour and on Broadway, The Big Life, Elmina's Kitchen, Scrooge – The Musical, The Night of the Iguana, A Few Good Men, A Man For All Seasons alongside UK tours of Jesus Christ Superstar, Tommy, Tell Me on a Sunday and This is Elvis. He produced the London revival of Cabaret at the Lyric Theatre in September 2006, starring Anna Maxwell Martin, James Dreyfus and Sheila Hancock.

He has helped start the careers of many current West End theatre producers, including Mark Rubinstein and Marc Sinden. It has been estimated that he employs more actors in a year than any employer other than the BBC.

He has also directed many productions, including Blood Brothers, Whistle Down the Wind; he was asked by Andrew Lloyd Webber to make changes to the direction of Love Never Dies. Bill Kenwright additionally produced & directed the 2018/19 UK touring production of Saturday Night Fever, in which Richard Winsor (as the preliminary Tony Manero) perceived the symbolic "Stayin' Alive" dance spectacle as "The Kneebreaker" & he gleefully presented the deceiving "Stage Pose" downgrade (created by Arlene Phillips in 1997).

Current and recent productions, mainly musicals, include:
 Fame – UK National Tour (2014)
 Blood Brothers – Phoenix Theatre, London and on UK National Tour, starring Helen Hobson and Steven Houghton
 Cabaret – Savoy Theatre, London with Will Young, Michelle Ryan and Sian Phillips
 Joseph and the Amazing Technicolor Dreamcoat – UK National Tour, starring Joe McElderry
 The Wizard of Oz – London Palladium, London (2011)
 Jekyll & Hyde – UK National Tour (2011)
 Evita – World Tour, starring Madalena Alberto and Gian Marco Schiaretti (2018)

Film
2019 The Fanatic (producer)
2017 My Pure Land (producer)
2012 Broken (producer)
2011 Dixie: The People's Legend (executive producer) (in post-production)
2009 Chéri (producer)
2004 The Purifiers (producer)
2003 The Boys from County Clare (executive producer)
2003 Die, Mommie, Die! (producer)
2001 Zoe (producer)
1999 Don't Go Breaking My Heart (producer)
1991 Stepping Out (executive producer)

Music
Kenwright has his own record label (Bill Kenwright Records), which had released three albums as of February 2008. The London Palladium cast recording of Scrooge (starring Tommy Steele) and the 2006 Lyric Theatre Recording of Cabaret were joined in February 2008 by the debut album of Kenwright's new boy group Dream On.

Dream On, comprising five runners up from the BBC's Any Dream Will Do – Craig Chalmers, Lewis Bradley, Chris Crosby, Chris Barton and Antony Hansen was formed in January 2008.

He began his music career in a band known as the Chevrolets. Perhaps less known is Kenwright's recording career both solo and with a group
Bill Kenwright and the Runaways:
 "I want to go back there again"/"Walk through dreams" Columbia DB8239 (August 1967)

and solo, as Bill Kenwright:
 "Love's Black & White"/"Giving Up" MGM 1430 (July 1968)
 "Tiggy"/"House That Fell on its Face" MGM 1463 (November 1968)
 "Baby I Could Be So Good at Loving"/"Boy & a Girl" MGM 1478 (January 1969)
 "Sugar Man"/"Epitaph"/"When Times Were Good" Fontana TF 1065 (October 1969)

Kenwright tried his hand at record production in 1969, producing two singles for Manchester band Money, who also worked as his backing band for several cabaret gigs in Oldham and at Allinson's, Liverpool. The first record, "Come Laughing Home", was the title music for Kenwright's first foray into theatrical production, with Reginald Marsh (also a star of Coronation Street) as co-producer. The show starred Anne Reid, who at the time was playing Valerie Barlow in Coronation Street. It was the first time a Coronation Street star had worked in live theatre whilst still acting in the series. The show opened at Blackpool's Grand Theatre. The single was also released in Argentina.

Actor
As a young man he became an actor. His early successes included a role in Coronation Street as Gordon Clegg, who was introduced in April 1968. Kenwright left the show after a year to pursue his producing career in March 1969, although he did return to the show on occasion throughout the 1970s for guest appearances. He continued to appear in Coronation Street occasionally until 2012. He had brief stints in other shows, such as The Villains and The Liver Birds, and appeared in the films Carry On Matron (1972), as a reporter, and England, My England (1995). Since 1997 he has managed the Theatre Royal in Windsor.

Everton Football Club
Kenwright is the current chairman of Everton Football Club. He succeeded Littlewoods director Philip Carter in the role. Kenwright has been on the Everton board since 1989. He became the second largest shareholder in 1999, when Peter Johnson sold his shareholding after the Football Association told to him sell his interests in either Tranmere Rovers or Everton. He became the largest stakeholder in the club in 2004.

Scottish international forward Andy Gray reported in his autobiography that the Everton board were ready to offer Gray the job as manager in August 1997, but Kenwright, then director, had wanted to appoint Howard Kendall as manager for a third time. Gray would decide not to become Everton manager and Kendall was appointed.

1994 buyout proposal
Kenwright became involved in a consortium to buy Everton in 1994, as his consortium rivalled Birkenhead-based Peter Johnson. Kenwright's consortium had assurances from the Everton owner's family head Lady Grantchester that the Moores family would sell their stake in the club. Kenwright's proposal was dismissed as the "Manchester Consortium" in the Liverpool Echo, as the rivalry between Liverpool and Manchester was enough to deter supporters' support. Kenwright's consortium included Manchester-based Tom Cannon, Tony Tighe (who later went on to create the Everton Collection) and Mike Dyble, whilst building magnate Arthur Abercromby was Cheshire-based. Abercromby offered a £2 million interest-free loan to the club for the purchase of players.

Kenwright, who had been a director at Everton for ten years, had an opportunity to sway the board members to accept his bid but chose not to because he did not want a public relations battle with the more affluent Johnson. Tighe, in an interview with a journalist David Conn, said: "Bill didn't want a public row, that's why he didn't go to press much. He wanted the board to be unanimous. As he saw it, he didn't want Everton's name to be dragged through controversy." Peter Johnson's bid was accepted by the Everton board. Johnson installed Kenwright (the half Belgian half English theatre impresario) as vice-chairman and Sir Philip Carter was re-instated as chairman.

1999 buyout proposal and True Blue Holdings
Kenwright's consortium bought 68% of Everton F.C. from Peter Johnson for £20 million in 1999. A holding company called True Blue (Holdings) Ltd was formed in January 2000. The stakeholders in True Blue Holdings included Paul Gregg, Jimmy Mulville, Jon Woods and Willy Russell before it was dissolved in 2004. Mihir Bose reported that Anita Gregg lent up to £7 million to Kenwright. Upon completion of the deal, Kenwright said: "Acquiring Peter Johnson's shares is only the first step to restoring a great club to where it belongs – to where it should be. If you are going to run a successful football club you need two qualities: you need to be realistic and you need a plan. I'm realistic and I have a plan."

In 2003, he attempted to move Everton to the Kings Dock on the riverside but after a public feud with director Paul Gregg over the proposal's finances and the sale of Wayne Rooney, the move fell through. Gregg had wanted to keep Rooney at the club and Kenwright reluctantly felt it was best he be sold to ease the club's financial burden. Paul and Anita Gregg later sold their shares to Florida-based businessman Robert Earl. Kenwright's close friend Philip Green is believed to have helped him secure the club after being approached for help.

Chairmanship
On 1 June 2004, Kenwright became chairman of Everton Football Club. On the same day, Trevor Birch was appointed chief executive officer to replace the outgoing Michael Dunford. Kenwright said that Birch would be his "sounding board" and that the new CEO should "dictate the policy of the football club". Kenwright stated that Birch had not been brought in to sell the club, but that a new investor can have his shares as long as they "have money to run the club". Birch resigned six weeks later. He resigned after a meeting with True Blue Holding (Kenwright, Woods, Gregg and Abercromby) where the board opted to not to sell the club. Gregg claimed there was a refusal to relinquish control by other directors and that it was preventing progress at the club.

Fortress Sports Fund
In August 2004, it was reported that a Brunei-based fund Fortess Sports Fund (FSF) were interested in buying a stake in Everton. Following the public fall-out with director Paul Gregg, it was anticipated that Gregg's shares in addition to others would be sold to the fund. Kenwright and Everton director Jon Woods were in favour of accepting the investment whilst Paul Gregg was sceptical and refused to endorse it. Gregg believed that the fund under-valued his investment, it was reported that the fund's bid was £12.8 million for 29.9% of the club.

In February 2005, Keith Wyness stated that the club had begun to look for other potential investors. In April 2005, Samuelson stated that "the Fund is completed and registered" but Everton director Paul Gregg publicly questioned the FSF: "As a director I have not received any proof of funds – or that they even exist." The Liverpool Echo described the FSF situation as a "farce". Paul Gregg stated that he had been "led down the garden path and that the whole exercise has embarrassed the club." Samuelson re-iterated that funds were ready; "The fund is approved and ready to go. I have not received the actual certificate of incorporation of the fund but that is a technicality." He stated that an EGM was necessary to confirm the FSF fund. "As far as I'm concerned it's a fait accompli – subject to the approval of an EGM of shareholders." An EGM was never called and the question of investment into Everton from the FSF fell away from the public eye.

In November 2005, at the following AGM. Kenwright said that Samuelson "was someone who I believed could have come up with the money, he had his credentials and thought he could come up with a deal that was good for the club ... but he didn't, like many many other people, come up with the goods." He added: "I am spending 24 hours a day trying to raise finance for this club. I had a meeting today, three yesterday, all involving money that would dilute my shareholding – but I'm not interested in that."

2004 Extraordinary General Meeting
By September 2004, concerns amongst fans had grown about the future of the club. An Extraordinary General Meeting was called by shareholders; "The shareholders of the Company express their deep concern at the current state of affairs in the Company". It called for the board of directors to resign if they did not address previous motions to the satisfaction of shareholders Kenwright is considered approachable by fans and prior to the EGM he contacted a fan website before the press regarding the meeting.

2008 Extraordinary General Meeting
In 2007, Kenwright said in an interview on ITV that Goodison Park would soon fail to obtain a ground safety certificate and announced that he would like to move the club to Kirkby as part of a proposal known as Destination Kirkby which included a Tesco supermarket and a retail park. The pursuit of this project led to minor shareholders of the club calling for an Extraordinary General Meeting in 2008. After it was confirmed that the EGM would go ahead, Keith Wyness resigned and was replaced by Robert Elstone who was promoted to the position from within.

At this meeting, Kenwright revealed that he took business advice from retail industry leaders Sir Philip Green and Sir Terry Leahy. The minority shareholders determined that the club should not pursue the project due to a growing number of concerns. However, Kenwright and the other majority shareholders, using one share one vote forced the resolution to be defeated and the project to proceed. The project was called in by the Secretary for State and a public inquiry determined that the project should not proceed after hearing evidence from groups who opposed the scheme such as Keep Everton In Our City (KEIOC)

In April 2008, he agreed to produce Dixie: The People's Legend, a documentary on Everton legend Dixie Dean produced by Liverpool-based company Tabacula.

Personal life
Kenwright was married to actress Anouska Hempel from 1978 to 1980 and has a daughter and two grandchildren from his relationship with the actress Virginia Stride. He is currently in a long-term relationship with the actress Jenny Seagrove. They live in London. The West End theatre publicist Adam Kenwright is his nephew who runs advertising and marketing company aka.

Honours
He received an Honorary Fellowship from Liverpool's John Moores University and is an Honorary Professor of University of West London in London.

Kenwright was awarded the CBE for his services to film and theatre in the 2001 New Years Honours List.

In November 2008 he was awarded an Honorary degree of Doctor of Letters (D.Litt) from Nottingham Trent University in recognition of his outstanding contribution and commitment to British theatre.

On 3 January 2014, Kenwright appeared on the BBC show Pointless Celebrities. He and his partner Jenny Seagrove reached the final and won the Pointless trophy, but gave three incorrect answers and missed out on the £2,500 jackpot.

References

External links
 Bill Kenwright Productions
 
 
 "Bill and John at the Aftershow Party". 9 June video of Kenwright on "great" new "musical star" Lee Mead, whom BBC One viewers had chosen by phone vote minutes earlier to play the lead role in Joseph and the Amazing Technicolor Dreamcoat.

1945 births
Living people
English theatre managers and producers
English football chairmen and investors
Everton F.C. directors and chairmen
People from Allerton
Commanders of the Order of the British Empire
People educated at Liverpool Institute High School for Boys
Theatre people from Merseyside